Siparuna palenquensis is a species of plant in the Siparunaceae family. It is endemic to Ecuador.

References

Siparunaceae
Endemic flora of Ecuador
Endangered plants
Endangered biota of South America
Taxonomy articles created by Polbot